A strum is the act of brushing one's fingers over the strings of a string instrument.

Strum may also refer to:

Places
 Strum, Albania, a village in Roskovec municipality, Fier County, Albania
 Strum, Wisconsin, a village, United States

People
 Strum (surname), a surname
 Shirley Strum Kenny (born 1935), President of the State University of New York

Other uses
 Strum (grape), a red wine grape

See also
 Strom Thurmond
Strom Thurmond Federal Building and United States Courthouse
 Strom Thurmond High School
 Sturm (disambiguation)